The following is a list of rulers (usually dukes) who ruled both Schleswig and Holstein, starting from the first Holstein count who received Schleswig, until both territories were annexed by the Kingdom of Prussia in 1866; and afterwards, titular dukes.

The Houses of Schauenburg and Estridsen

In the course of history, the County of Holstein was several times partitioned among the inheriting sons into up to six lines. In 1386 King Oluf II of Denmark and his mother-regent, Queen Margaret I, enfeoffed in Nyborg Gerhard VI, Count of Holstein-Rendsborg and his cognatic successors with the Duchy of Schleswig, which had been in the royal family's hands until 1375. He was as Gerhard II duke of Schleswig. Until 1390 the Rendsborg branch united by inheritance all branches except of that of Holstein-Pinneberg. It remaining a separately ruled territory in Holstein until its line was extinct in 1640, when Holstein-Pinneberg was merged into the then Duchy of Holstein. Furthermore, the here mentioned rulers of course only reigned Holstein and Schleswig in their respective territorial composition of the time, thus without states and territories only merged later in what became today's State of Schleswig-Holstein, such as Ditmarsh, conquered and annexed in 1559, Saxe-Lauenburg merged in 1876, Heligoland (British rule 1807–1891), Free and Hanseatic City of Lübeck, Region of Lübeck, together with some Hamburgian exclaves in 1937. In turn much of the current westerly, northerly and easterly suburbs within Greater Hamburg were ceded from Holstein on 1 April 1937 (Cf. Greater Hamburg Act). North Schleswig had merged into Denmark in 1920. Some Lauenburgian and Mecklenburgian municipalities were exchanged by the Barber Lyashchenko Agreement in 1945.

Partitions of Schleswig-Holstein in the period 

{|align="center" style="border-spacing: 0px; border: 1px solid black; text-align: center;"
|+ 
|- 
| colspan=5 style="background: #fff;" |County of Holstein-Schauenburg (1110-1137)Under domain of Schauenburg family
| rowspan="14" style="background: #fedf;" |Duchy of Schleswig<small>Under domain of Estridsen family(1080-1375) and Schauenburg family(Holstein-Rendsburg branch)(1325-1330 and 1375-1433)</small>
|- 
| colspan=4 style="background: #BBCC88;" |County of Holstein (1137-1143)
| colspan=1 style="background: #DDCCBB;" |County of Schauenburg (1137-1143)
|- 
| colspan=5 style="background: #fff;" |County of Holstein-Schauenburg (1143-1203)
|- 
| colspan=4 style="background: #eee;" |Annexed by Denmark 
| colspan=1 style="background: #DDCCBB;" |County of Schauenburg(1203-1227) 
|- 
| colspan=5 style="background: #fff;" |County of Holstein-Schauenburg(1227-1261) 
|- 
| colspan=2 style="background: #AABBCC;" |      
| colspan=3 rowspan="2" style="background: #AAFF88;" |Holstein-Itzehoe and Schauenburg(1261-1290)
|- 
| colspan=1 rowspan="2" style="background: #cab;" |Holstein-Segeberg(1st creation)(1273-1315)
| colspan=1 style="background: #abc;" |Holstein-Kiel (1261-1390)
|- 
| colspan=1 style="background: #abc;" |      
| colspan=1 rowspan="2" style="background: #ac9;" |Holstein-Plön(1290-1350)
| colspan=1 style="background: #FFB6B6;" |        
| colspan=1 rowspan="7" style="background: #cef;" |Holstein-Pinneberg and Schauenburg(1290-1640)
|- 
| colspan=2 style="background: #AABBCC;" |      
| colspan=1 style="background: #FFB6B6;" |Holstein-Rendsburg(1290-1459)
|- 
| colspan=3 style="background: #AABBCC;" |      
| colspan=1 style="background: #FFB6B6;" |       
|- 
| colspan=4 style="background: #FFB6B6;" |       
|- 
| colspan=1 style="background: #CCAABB;" |Holstein-Segeberg(2nd creation)(1397-1403)
| colspan=3 style="background: #FFB6B6;" |       
|- 
| colspan=4 style="background: #FFB6B6;" |       
|- 
|colspan=4 style="background: #eee;" |Annexed by Denmark 
|-
|}

With Otto's death, the main line of Schauenburg was extinct, and Holstein-Pinneberg was acquired by Christian IV for the royal share of the Holstein duchy. Schauenburg went to the House of Lippe.

The House of Oldenburg

In 1460, Schleswig fell to the Danish royal House of Oldenburg, in the person of Christian I, who inherited not only the Duchy, a Danish fief, but also the County of Holstein-Rendsburg, a Saxe-Lauenburgian subfief within the Holy Roman Empire, following the death of his maternal uncle Adolf I (and VIII as Count of Holstein-Rendsburg). In 1474, Lauenburg's liege lord Emperor Frederick III elevated Christian as Count of Holstein-Rendsburg to Duke of Holstein, thus becoming an immediate imperial vassal (see imperial immediacy). The smaller Holstein-Pinneberg remained a county further ruled by the House of Schauenburg. In 1544, after Christian III's brothers reached majority, they partitioned the Duchies of Holstein (a fief of the Holy Roman Empire) and of Schleswig (a Danish fief) in an unusual way, following negotiations between the brothers and the Estates of the Realm of the duchies, which opposed a factual partition. They determined their youngest brother Frederick for a career as Lutheran administrator of an ecclesiastical state within the Holy Roman Empire.

So the revenues of the duchies were divided in three equal shares by assigning the revenues of particular areas and landed estates to each of the elder brothers, while other general revenues, such as taxes from towns and customs dues, were levied together but then shared among the brothers. The estates, whose revenues were assigned to the parties, made Holstein and Schleswig look like patchwork rags, technically inhibiting the emergence of separate new duchies, as intended by the estates of the duchies. The secular rule in the fiscally divided duchies thus became a condominium of the parties. As dukes of Holstein and Schleswig, the rulers of both houses bore the formal title of "Duke of Schleswig, Holstein, Dithmarschen and Stormarn".

The dynastic name Holstein-Gottorp comes as convenient usage from the technically more correct Duke of Schleswig and Holstein at Gottorp. Adolf, the third son of Duke and King Frederick I and the second youngest half-brother of King Christian III, founded the dynastic branch called House of Holstein-Gottorp, which is a cadet branch of the then royal Danish House of Oldenburg. The Danish monarchs and the Dukes of Holstein-Gottorp listed below ruled both duchies together as to general government, however, collected their revenues in their separate estates. John II the Elder conveniently called Duke of Schleswig-Holstein-Haderslev produced no issue, so no branch emerged from his side.

Similar to the above-mentioned agreement Christian III's youngest son John the Younger gained for him and his heirs a share in Holstein's and Schleswig's revenues in 1564, comprising a third of the royal share, thus a ninth of Holstein and Schleswig as to the fiscal point of view. John the Younger and his heirs, however, had no share in the condominial rule, they were only titular partitioned-off dukes.

The share of John II the Elder'', who died in 1580, was halved between Adolf and Frederick II, thus increasing again the royal share by a fiscal sixth of Holstein and Schleswig. As an effect the complicated fiscal division of both separate duchies, Holstein and Schleswig, with shares of each party scattered in both duchies, provided them with a condominial government binding both together, partially superseding their legally different affiliation as Holy Roman and Danish fiefs.

In 1864, following the Second Schleswig War, the Duchies of Schleswig and Holstein were ceded by the Danish King and were ruled in a joint condominium by Austria and Prussia. Following the defeat of Austria in the Austro-Prussian War in 1866, they were annexed by Prussia and were formed into the new Prussian Province of Schleswig-Holstein, part of Germany since 1870.

Titular dukes
Prussia, the annexing state, recognized the head of the House of Oldenburg as mediatised duke of this duchy/these two duchies, with the rank and all the titles pertaining:

Gallery of Pretenders

See also
List of Danish monarchs
List of dukes of Schleswig
Counts of Schauenburg and Holstein

Notes

 
Schleswig-Holstein-related lists
Schleswig-Holstein
Schleswig-Holstein
Lists of German nobility

da:Slesvigske hertuger
de:Liste der Herzöge von Schleswig
hu:Schleswig hercegeinek listája
nl:Lijst van hertogen van Sleeswijk
no:Hertuger av Slesvig